Habermann's Mill and Villa is a pair of monuments in Bludov municipality in the Olomouc Region of the Czech Republic. It is formed by a watermill and an Art Nouveau villa. Together it forms a small hamlet named Habermannův mlýn.

Geography
The Morava River flows next to the hamlet. The watermill is powered by a branch of the Morava.

History

The area was owned by the Sudeten German Habermann family. The Art Nouveau villa was built in 1920 as Hubert Habermann's residence. The adjoining buildings were used as a sawmill, watermill and cooperage. A small business producing wooden boxes was established in the mill too.

The mill as well as the villa was confiscated by law enforcement in 1945. Habermann was arrested and murdered by a local barber.

The villa was rebuilt and turned into public housing. A turbine was installed in the mill. Mill warehouses were used as a garage for a collective farm.

Economy
In the 1990s, the villa was rebuilt as a 4-star hotel and a restaurant, and is still used today. Part of the mill was rebuilt as subsidized housing.

Two Francis turbines are installed in former mill. Turbines outputs are 41.44 kW and 25.90 kW. Two overshot water wheels are installed in former sawmill. Its output is 8.8 kW and 6.29 kW. Its water source is the Morava.

Transport
A bus stop is situated in the hamlet.

The I/44 road passes between the villa and the mill.

Art
The place is reflected in Josef Urban's Habermann's Mill book. A real story of Hubert Habermann's murder was imagined. The book was controversial because it blames the Pospíšil family who still live in Bludov.

The Habermann film was made based on the events that took place here.

References

Populated places in Šumperk District
Art Nouveau architecture in the Czech Republic
Art Nouveau houses
Houses completed in 1920
Houses in the Czech Republic
Sawmills
Flour mills